Resistance: The Underground War Against Hitler, 1939-1945 is a 2022 history book by Halik Kochanski. It is about the European resistance movements during World War II.

References

2022 non-fiction books
Books about World War II
Non-fiction books about war
W. W. Norton & Company books
World War II resistance movements